"Slippin' into Darkness" is a song written and performed in 1971 by War. The song was produced by Jerry Goldstein. A live version of the song was featured as the B-side to their 1974 single "Ballero".

Background
This song is an unusual blues form with the first lines being repeated in an African and Latin rhythm.  The song is from the perspective of someone whose  friend's life was taken away, who withdraws from reality, having to pay the consequences.  Because of the song's length in the album version, at 6:59, the single radio edit version of 3:59 omits the slower introduction plus the second verse of the song.

Chart performance
It reached #12 on the U.S. R&B chart and #16 on the U.S. pop chart in 1972, logging 22 weeks on that chart, tied for most total weeks inside that year with Gallery's "Nice to Be with You".  It was featured on their 1971 album All Day Music.  The song ranked #23 on Billboard magazine's Top 100 singles of 1972. In Canada, it reached #13.

Other versions
The Nigerian funk combo The Funkees recorded a version in 1973.
Mr G. And The Dayton Sidewinders released a version on Carlco Records (1974).
Cargo Cult released a version of the song on their 1986 album Strange Men Bearing Gifts.
Black Uhuru released a version of the song on their 1992 album Mystical Truth.
Pucho & His Latin Soul Brothers released a version of the song on their 1995 album Rip a Dip.
Sandra St. Victor released a version of the song on her 2001 album Gemini: Both Sides.
Ramsey Lewis and Nancy Wilson released a version of the song on their 2003 album Simple Pleasures.
Widespread Panic released a version of the song on their 2004 live album Jackassolantern.
Lettuce released a version of the song on their 2012 album Fly.
Marcus Miller released a version of the song on his 2012 album Renaissance.

Sampling
War's version was sampled in the 1988 songs "Guitar Playin'" and "Payback's a Mutha" by King T on his album Act a Fool.
War's version was sampled in the 1989 song "You Got Larceny" by 2 Live Crew on their album As Clean As They Wanna Be.
War's version was sampled in the 1990 song "Rock Dis Funky Joint" by Poor Righteous Teachers on their album Holy Intellect.
War's version was sampled in the 1994 song "Lil Knucklehead" by South Central Cartel on their album 'N Gatz We Truss.
War's version was sampled in the 1996 song "Sippin' On A 40" by Eazy-E on his album Str8 off tha Streetz of Muthaphukkin Compton.
War's version was sampled in the 1997 song "Capítulo 4, Versículo 3" by Racionais MC's on their album Sobrevivendo no Inferno.
War's version was sampled in the 1999 song "I'm Good at Being Bad" by TLC on their album FanMail.
War's musical hook was used as the basis for the 1974 song "Get Up, Stand Up" by Bob Marley

In popular culture
War's version was featured in the fifth episode of 2016 season of The Get Down.
War's version was featured on the soundtrack of the 2016 film Suicide Squad.
War's version was featured on the soundtrack of the 1992 film American Me.

Certifications

References

1971 songs
1971 singles
Songs written by Lonnie Jordan
War (American band) songs
Ramsey Lewis songs
Nancy Wilson (jazz singer) songs
Song recordings produced by Mark Batson
Song recordings produced by Marcus Miller
United Artists Records singles